Amélie Mauresmo was the defending champion, but lost in the quarterfinals to Francesca Schiavone

Seeds
The top four seeds received a bye into the second round.

  Amélie Mauresmo (quarterfinals)
  Venus Williams (champion)
  Vera Zvonareva (semifinals)
  Svetlana Kuznetsova (final)
  Paola Suárez (withdrew due to low back pain)
  Silvia Farina Elia (quarterfinals)
  Patty Schnyder (second round)
  Anna Smashnova-Pistolesi (quarterfinals)
  Francesca Schiavone (semifinals)

Main draw

Finals

Top half

Bottom half

External links
WTA tournament draws

JandS Cup - Singles